Count Albrecht Friedrich Wilhelm Bernhard of Hohenau (21 May 1857, in the Albrechtsberg Castle, in Dresden – 15 April 1914, in Ochelhermsdorf) was a German nobleman.

Frederick, also known as Fritz, was a son of Prince Albrecht of Prussia (1809–1872), who was a brother of Emperor William I and King Frederick William IV of Prussia, from his second, morganatic marriage with Rosalie (1820–1879), daughter of the Prussian War Minister Gustav von Rauch. Because his father’s marriage to his mother was morganatic, Frederick was not counted as a member of the House of Hohenzollern.

After the death of his mother, Frederick was, together with his older brother, William, heir to the Schloss Albrechtsberg in Dresden, which he occupied until his death. In 1901, together with Friedrich Botho, a brother of Philipp, Prince of Eulenburg, he had to leave the Prussian military service because of his homosexual inclinations.

Frederick was also involved in the two biggest scandals of the German Empire under Kaiser Wilhelm II. He belonged to the Liebenberg Round Table and played a role alongside his wife in the so-called .

Family
The couple had the following issue:

 Albrecht Graf von Hohenau (1882–1966)
 Wilhelm Graf von Hohenau (1884–1957); a horse rider who competed in the 1912 Summer Olympics.
 Friedrich Karl Graf von Hohenau (1895–1929)
 Friedrich Franz Graf von Hohenau (1896–1918); killed in action during the First World War.

Ancestry

References

 John C. G. Röhl, Wilhelm II.: der Aufbau der persönlichen Monarchie, 1888-1900, Munich: C. H. Beck, 2001, pp. 744seqq.
 Wolfgang Wippermann, Skandal im Jagdschloss Grunewald. Männlichkeit und Ehre im deutschen Kaiserreich, Darmstadt: Primus Verlag, 2010. 
 http://www.blasewitz1.de/albrecht.htm
 https://web.archive.org/web/20071010040150/http://www.auris-subtilis.de/as-media/booklets/book-albrechtsbg.pdf
 John C. G. Röhl, Kaiser, Hof und Staat: Wilhelm II. und die deutsche Politik, Munich: C. H. Beck, 2002, p. 108

1857 births
1914 deaths
Nobility from Dresden
Counts of Germany